Brian Edward Barkley (born December 8, 1975) is an American former professional baseball player.  The ,  left-hander was a relief pitcher in Major League Baseball who worked in six games pitched for the Boston Red Sox in the 1998 season.

Biography
Barkley was born in Conroe, Texas and graduated from Midway High School in Waco, Texas. He was drafted by the Red Sox in the 5th round of the 1994 Major League Baseball Draft, and played his first game on May 28, 1998.

In his one-season career, Barkley posted an 0–0 record with two strikeouts, 16 hits allowed (including two home runs and nine bases on balls in 11 innings pitched).

Barkley is the grandson of Red Barkley, who played for the St. Louis Browns, Boston Bees and Brooklyn Dodgers between 1937 and 1943.

Brian graduated from the Texas College of Osteopathic Medicine in 2013 and completed his residency at the Scott & White Pediatrics Residency Program located in Temple, Texas.

See also
 Boston Red Sox all-time roster

References

External links

Brian Barkley at Baseball Almanac

1975 births
Living people
Baseball players from Texas
Boston Red Sox players
Gulf Coast Red Sox players
Major League Baseball pitchers
Pawtucket Red Sox players
People from Conroe, Texas
Sarasota Red Sox players
Trenton Thunder players